Yolqullar (also, Yëlkullar) is a village in the Dashkasan Rayon of Azerbaijan and forms part of the municipality of Zinzahal.

References 

Populated places in Dashkasan District